Feliks Jaroński (6 June 1777 – 26 December 1827) was a Polish Catholic priest and philosopher.

Life
In 1809–18 Jaroński was a professor at Kraków University. A follower of Kantism, he postulated a renewal of philosophy through the rejection of empiricism and a return to metaphysics. He was the first to write a history of Polish logic.

Works
Jakiej filozofii Polacy potrzebują? (What Kind of Philosophy Do the Poles Need?, 1810)
O filozofii (On Philosophy, parts 1–3, 1812)

See also
History of philosophy in Poland
List of Poles

Notes

References
"Jaroński, Feliks," Encyklopedia Powszechna PWN (PWN Universal Encyclopedia), Warsaw, Państwowe Wydawnictwo Naukowe, vol. 2, 1974, p. 337.
Władysław Tatarkiewicz, "Outline of the History of Philosophy in Poland," translated from the Polish by Christopher Kasparek, The Polish Review, vol. XVIII, no. 3, 1973, pp. 73–85.

1777 births
1827 deaths
19th-century Polish philosophers
Polish Roman Catholic priests
Kantian philosophers